Müritzsee is a lake in the Mecklenburgische Seenplatte district of Mecklenburg-Vorpommern, Germany. At an elevation of 62.1 m, its surface area is 112.63 km².

References

Lakes of Mecklenburg-Western Pomerania